Colletta may refer to:

 Colletta di Castelbianco, Savona, Liguria, Italy

People with the surname
 Mike Colletta (1927–2007), American businessman and politician
 Pietro Colletta (1775–1831), Neapolitan general and historian
 Vince Colletta (1923–1991), highly prolific American comic book artist and art director

See also
 Coleta, Illinois
 Coletta (disambiguation)
 Collett (disambiguation)
 Collette, a given name and surname